Fallen Heroes may refer to:

Fallen Heroes (film), a 2007 Italian crime-drama film
"Fallen Heroes" (Homicide: Life on the Street)
Fallen Heroes (novel), a Star Trek: Deep Space Nine novel
Fallen Heroes (EP), a 2016 EP by Metal Allegiance

See also
Fallen Heroes Act, an act of the U.S. Congress
 Fallen Hero (TV series), a 1978 British television series
 "Fallen Hero", an episode of the TV series Star Trek: Enterprise
Tragic Hero, a related narrative concept of a hero that, because of determined circumstances, is prone to fall to evil.